The Holy fathers slain at Sinai and Raithu are saints venerated together on January 14 by the Eastern Orthodox Church and the Greek Catholic Churches. They are also listed on the same date in the Roman Martyrology of the Roman Catholic Church.

Background
The holy monastic fathers were slain at Sinai and Raithu. There were two occasions when the monks and hermits were murdered by the barbarians. The first took place during the reign of Diocletian, about the year 296, when forty fathers were killed at Mt. Sinai, and thirty-nine were slain at Raithu on the same day. The attack at Raithu is attributed to the tribe called the Blemmyes, from parts of Arabia.

Their names are given as Isaiah, Sabbas, Moses and his disciple Moses, Jeremiah, Paul, Adam, Sergius, Domnus, Proclus, Hypatius, Isaac, Macarius, Mark, Benjamin, Eusebius, Elias, and others (4th-5th century).

The martyrs of Raithu were killed about the middle of the 5th century.

References

Groups of Eastern Orthodox saints
Male murder victims